Danielle Kamber (born 27 October 1954) is a former Swiss slalom canoeist who competed in the 1970s.

She won two medals in the K-1 team event at the ICF Canoe Slalom World Championships with a gold in 1975 and a silver in 1973.

Kamber finished 12th in the K-1 event at the 1972 Summer Olympics in Munich.

References

1954 births
Canoeists at the 1972 Summer Olympics
Living people
Olympic canoeists of Switzerland
Swiss female canoeists
Medalists at the ICF Canoe Slalom World Championships